Jules Ehrat (1 February 1905 – 1997) was a Swiss chess player born in Lohn, Schaffhausen.  He was the 1942 Swiss Chess Champion jointly with Martin Christoffel.

The Jules Ehrat Memorial chess tournament held in Zürich 13–22 August 1999 pitted two five-player teams against each other.  The German team, led by Christopher Lutz, defeated the Swiss team, led by Viktor Korchnoi, by 26½ to 23½.

References

External links

1905 births
1997 deaths
Swiss chess players
People from Schaffhausen
Sportspeople from the canton of Schaffhausen
20th-century chess players